Who Are You is a 1978 album by The Who.

Who Are You also may refer to:

Music 
 Who Are You? (EP), a 2013 EP by Kahi
 Who Are You? (album), a 2008 album by Nico Touches the Walls
 "Who Are You?" (song), a 1996 song by Eternal
 "Who Are You" (Emine Sari song), 2012
 "Who Are You" (The Who song), 1978
 "Who Are You", a song by Black Sabbath from Sabbath Bloody Sabbath
 "Who Are You", a song by Tom Waits from Bone Machine
 "Who Are You", a song by Carrie Underwood from Blown Away
 "Who Are You", a song by Jolin Tsai from 1019
 "Who Are You", a song by Show Lo from Show Time
 "Who are You?", a 1982 song by Void
 "Who Are You", a song by Fifth Harmony from Better Together

Film and television 
 Who Are You? (2008 TV series), a South Korean television series
 Who Are You? (2013 TV series), a South Korean television series
 Who Are You: School 2015, a South Korean television series
 Who Are You (Thai TV series), a Thai television series
 Who Are You? (film), a 1939 Italian film
 "Who Are You?" (Arrow), an episode of the American television series Arrow
 "Who Are You?" (Batwoman), an episode of the American television series Batwoman
 "Who Are You" (Buffy the Vampire Slayer), an episode of the American television series Buffy the Vampire Slayer
 "Who Are You?" (CSI), an episode of CSI: Crime Scene Investigation

See also 
 Who You Are (disambiguation)
 Chi sei?, a 1974 Italian horror film
 Quién Eres Tú (disambiguation)
 Quem É Você?, a 1996 Brazilian telenovela
 Wer bist du?, a 1997 album by Megaherz band